The Toledo Blue Stockings were a professional baseball team based in Toledo, Ohio, that played in the American Association for one season in 1884. The franchise used League Park and Tri-State Fair Grounds as their home fields. During their only season in existence, the team finished eighth in the AA with a record of 46-58.

Players

References

External links
Franchise index at Baseball-Reference and Retrosheet

Major League Baseball all-time rosters